Stōr-bizeshk were veterinarians within the Sassanid Persian army whose purpose was to ensure the safety and health of the steeds before battles. These men would care for the horses, feeding them and grooming them. According to some of the sources if the steeds would die in their care the stor bezashk would be fined. They also had thorough knowledge of herbs.

See also 
 Cataphract
 Sassanid army
 Spahbod

References 
Dinkard VIII.26.11.
Sassanian Elite Cavalry AD 224-642 By Kaveh Farrokh
Sassanian Armies : the Iranian empire early 3rd to mid-7th centuries AD

External links 

Sasanian military offices
Cavalry units and formations of the Sassanian Empire
Veterinary professions